Barbara Wenta-Wojciechowska (born 15 March 1953) is a Polish rower. She competed in the women's eight event at the 1976 Summer Olympics.

References

1953 births
Living people
Polish female rowers
Olympic rowers of Poland
Rowers at the 1976 Summer Olympics
People from Tczew